Elektronik Türküler ("Electronic Folk Songs [of Turkey]") is the second album by Turkish rock musician Erkin Koray, originally released by Doğan Plakcılık in 1974.  This is his first work to be recorded for the LP format, as opposed to the 45 rpm singles which his output had been restricted to until the mid-1960s.

Stylistically, it combines psychedelic and progressive rock influences with traditional Turkish elements. This album is one of the more internationally acknowledged examples of Anatolian rock.

The album was rereleased on CD by World Psychedelia Ltd. in 1999 (WPC6-8461).

Track listing

Personnel
Erkin Koray: Electric guitar, Acoustic guitar, bağlama, piano, keyboards, lead vocals
Sedat Avcı: Drums, bongos, percussion
Ahmet Güvenç: Bass guitar
Doruk Onatkut: sound recording

References

1974 albums
Erkin Koray albums